Majadel is a town located in the Kaza of Tyre (sour) one of Mohafazah of South Lebanon kazas (districts). Mohafazah of South Lebanon is one of the eight mohafazats (governorates) of Lebanon.

Geography
It's 98 kilometers (60.8972 mi) away from Beyrouth (Beirut) the capital of Lebanon. Its elevation is 310 meters (1) (1017.11 ft - 339.016 yd) above sea level. Majadel (Tyr) surface stretches for 225 hectares (2.25 km2 - 0.8685 mi2)(2).

History
In 1596, it was named as a village, Majadil, in the Ottoman nahiya (subdistrict) of Tibnin under the liwa' (district) of Safad, with a population of 54 households, all Muslim. The villagers paid taxes on agricultural products, such as goats and beehives, in addition to occasional revenues and a fixed sum; a total of 6,450 akçe.

In 1875, Victor Guérin noted: "Here are seen at this day several great wine-presses, each composed of two compartments cut in the rock. One of these presses was lined within by small square cubes, making a mosaic. Here are also fine rock-cut tombs, some containing sarcophagi covered with arched arcosolia and other loculi destined for sarcophagi; and there are other tombs hollowed like simple graves, and covered by heavy blocks more or less squared. There are several broken sarcophagi, and especially a great piece of rock cut as to form a double sarcophagus, the sides of which are sculptured carefully, and ornamented with garlands, discs, trees, rose-work, and a beautiful garland supported in the centre by little columns. There are cisterns and two tanks, one square and the other circular, probably the work of the most ancient people who came to live in this place."

In 1881, the Palestine Exploration Fund's PEF Survey of Palestine described it as "A village, built of stone, with a few ruined houses, containing about 150 Metawileh. It is situated on a hill, surrounded by figs, olives, and arable land. Water supplied from a spring, cisterns, and brisket."

Location
The village is surrounded by several villages including Deyrintar, Chehabiye, Mahrouna, Jwaya.

Educational Establishments
The table below provides a comparison of public and private schools locally and nationally. It can be used to assess the distribution of students between public and private institutions both locally and nationally. All data provided on education concerning the 2005-2006 school year. Since the publication of more recent figures we will strive to published online.

Economic Activities

References

Bibliography

 (p. 96)

External links
Survey of Western Palestine, Map 2: IAA, Wikimedia commons
Mjadel (Tyr) Localliban: Centre de resource sur le developpement local

Populated places in Tyre District
Shia Muslim communities in Lebanon